Sultan Hamid Al Jasmi (born 1 August 1981) is a writer from the United Arab Emirates. He was born in Sharjah.

Education

Bachelor of International Relations and Diplomacy.

References

External links
 Sultan al JasmiBlog. 

Emirati writers

Living people
1981 births
People from the Emirate of Sharjah